Luna, officially the Municipality of Luna, , is a 2nd class municipality in the province of Apayao, Philippines. According to the 2020 census, it has a population of 21,297 people. It currently serves as the de facto capital of Apayao where the provincial capitol and related offices is located the New Apayao Government Center. Kabugao remains as the de jure capital.

Its former name was Macatel, changed to Luna by the town's founding father, the Ilocano explorer Antonino Barroga from Dingras, Ilocos Norte.

Geography

According to the Philippine Statistics Authority, the municipality has a land area of  constituting  of the  total area of Apayao.

Barangays
Luna is politically subdivided into 22 barangays. These barangays are headed by elected officials: Barangay Captain, Barangay Council, whose members are called Barangay Councilors. All are elected every three years.

Climate

Demographics

In the 2020 census, Luna had a population of 21,297.

Economy

Government
Luna, belonging to the lone congressional district of the province of Apayao, is governed by a mayor designated as its local chief executive and by a municipal council as its legislative body in accordance with the Local Government Code. The mayor, vice mayor, and the councilors are elected directly by the people through an election which is being held every three years.

Elected officials

References

External links

 [ Philippine Standard Geographic Code]

Municipalities of Apayao